The Goan day gecko (Cnemaspis goaensis) is a species of lizard in the family Gekkonidae. The species is native to southwestern India.

Geographic range
C. goaensis is found in the Indian states of Goa and Karnatka.

Reproduction
C. goaensis is oviparous.

References

Further reading
Sharma RC (1976). "Records of the reptiles of Goa". Records of the Zoological Survey of India 71: 149–167. (Cnemaspis goaensis, new species, p. 152).

Cnemaspis
Reptiles described in 1976